Gédéon Kalulu Kyatengwa (born 29 August 1997) is a professional footballer who plays as a right-back for  club Lorient. Born in France, he plays for the DR Congo national team.

Club career
A youth product of Lyon, Kalulu signed his first professional contract with the club on 19 April 2017. After a season on loan with Bourg-en-Bresse, Kalulu signed with Ajaccio on 24 July 2019. He made his debut for Ajaccio in a 4–1 Coupe de la Ligue win over Valenciennes on 13 August 2019.

On 3 June 2022, Kalulu signed a four-year contract with Lorient.

International career
On 22 September 2020, Kalulu was called-up by the DR Congo. On 13 October 2020, he debuted for DR Congo in a 1–1 friendly tie with Morocco.

Personal life
Kalulu was born in France, and is of Rwandan and Congolese descent. He is the brother of the footballers Aldo and Pierre Kalulu.

References

External links
 
 
 OL Profile

1997 births
Living people
Footballers from Lyon
Association football fullbacks
Citizens of the Democratic Republic of the Congo through descent
Democratic Republic of the Congo footballers
Democratic Republic of the Congo international footballers
French footballers
Black French sportspeople
French people of Rwandan descent
French sportspeople of Democratic Republic of the Congo descent
Olympique Lyonnais players
AS Saint-Priest players
AC Ajaccio players
Football Bourg-en-Bresse Péronnas 01 players
FC Lorient players

Ligue 2 players
Championnat National 2 players
Championnat National 3 players